This article shows statistics of individual players for the football club Dinamo Zagreb It also lists all matches that Dinamo Zagreb will play in the 2008–09 season.

Events
26 April: Midfielder Luka Modrić agrees to a five-year contract with Premier League club Tottenham Hotspur in a transfer worth €21m, meaning he will leave Dinamo after the last game of the 2007–08 season, the Croatian Cup second leg final on 14 May.
9 May: Dinamo board of directors hold a press conference concerning the Zagreb Mayor Milan Bandić's announcement that the Maksimir stadium could be torn down and replaced by a new stadium built at a different location. Club's chairman Mirko Barišić, club's legends Slaven Zambata and Igor Cvitanović as well as the current vice-captain Igor Bišćan and Bad Blue Boys spokesman all express the view that the new stadium should be built in Maksimir.
14 May: Immediately after the cup final game against Hajduk Split at Poljud stadium, manager Zvonimir Soldo resigns, citing "bad atmosphere at the club".
20 May: Branko Ivanković appointed as manager again, only five months after being sacked and replaced by Zvonimir Soldo.
21 May: Defender Hrvoje Čale signs a four-year contract with the Turkish club Trabzonspor in a transfer worth €2.2m.
23 May: Goalkeeper Tomislav Butina signs a two-year contract with Dinamo on a free transfer after being released from Greek club Olympiacos. Butina returns to the club after spending five years playing abroad, and 15 years after his first top-flight debut for the Blues in 1993.
25 May: Defensive midfielder Ognjen Vukojević signs a five-year contract with Ukrainian club Dynamo Kiev on a transfer worth €6m.
4 June: Attacking midfielder Guillermo Suárez signs for Dinamo from Argentina's Tigre for an undisclosed fee.
5 June: Defender Etto agrees to a new four-year contract with Dinamo.
5 June: The 6th edition of the annual Mladen Ramljak Memorial Tournament hosted by Dinamo begins, featuring youth squads from Croatia and abroad. Dinamo youngsters beat Bulgarian side Litex Lovech 3–1.
6 June: UEFA commission inspect all venues expected to host the following Prva HNL season games and assigns Maksimir stadium a category 3 rating, declaring it fit to host European games.
6 June: Dinamo youth squad beats Osijek 4–1 and secures a place in the tournament final.
6 June: Forward Davor Vugrinec agrees to leave the club for local rivals NK Zagreb on a free transfer.
8 June: Dinamo youngsters win the Mladen Ramljak Memorial by beating Hajduk Split 1–0.
12 June: Dinamo sign midfielder Pedro Morales from Universidad de Chile for €1.6m.
13 June: Dinamo sign defender Luis Ibáñez from Boca Juniors on a five-year contract in a transfer worth for €650,000.
15 June: Goalkeeper Georg Koch is released and joins Austrian club Rapid Vienna on a free transfer.
3 July: Fearing hooliganism, Austrian organisers cancel the already scheduled pre-season friendly with Polish side Lech Poznań.
4 July: Two months after Newcastle United offered €2m for Josip Tadić, West Ham also expresses interest in bringing in the young striker.
5 July: Defender Marijan Buljat is released and joins rivals Hajduk Split on a four-year contract.
8 July: Forward Dario Zahora's loan to Domžale expires and agrees to a new loan to another Slovenian club Interblock Ljubljana.
15 July: Defender Tomislav Mikulić leaves the club and signs a two-year contract with Belgian club Standard Liège.
16 July: Dinamo start their European campaign by defeating Linfield 2–0 in the first leg of their UEFA Champions League 2008–09 First Qualifying Round.

First-team squad

Team roster
Updated 5 March 2009

Transfers

Summer
Midfielder Luka Modrić agreed to a five-year contract with Premier League club Tottenham Hotspur in a transfer worth €21m in late April, meaning his last game for the Croatian Cup second leg final on 14 May. On 22 May defender Hrvoje Čale signed a four-year contract with the Turkish side Trabzonspor for €2.2m, and four days later defensive midfielder Ognjen Vukojević joined Ukrainian giants Dynamo Kiev in a €6m transfer. During the summer transfer window, a group of players were released, including 33-year-old forward Davor Vugrinec who joins city rivals NK Zagreb, Georg Koch who signs a deal with Rapid Vienna and Tomislav Mikulić who signs a two-year contract with Standard Liège. Marijan Buljat and Dario Jertec were also released after failing to break into the first team squad under Branko Ivanković, and join biggest local rivals, Hajduk Split.

As for the arrivals, goalkeeper Tomislav Butina signed a two-year deal after being released by Olympiacos. Butina signed a two-year deal after being released by the Greek powerhouse, in a transfer which marked his return to the club after spending five years playing abroad, and 15 years after his first top-flight debut for the Blues in 1993. Heart of Hajduk Award winner Mirko Hrgović also joined the club from Japanese side JEF United, in a transfer which stirred some resentment by supporters of both Hajduk and Dinamo. Three South American players also joined the club in the summer transfer window: Luis Ibáñez and Guillermo Suárez came from Argentina's Boca Juniors and Tigre for €650,000 and €1m respectively, while Chilean international Pedro Morales joined from Universidad de Chile in a €1.6m transfer.

Did'dy Guela also left the club in late August amid heavy criticism by Ivanković and a publicized conflict with Ante Tomić in training. Two months after his contract was terminated he joined Greek side Larissa.

In

Out

Winter
On 15 December 2008, Dinamo executive Zdravko Mamić and sports director Zoran Mamić agreed on a -year deal with Adrián Calello signed from Argentina's Independiente. The following two signings were confirmed a few days later, in the form of forwards Miroslav Slepička, who signed from Sparta Prague a -year deal worth €1.5m, and the 21-year-old Ilija Sivonjić from the local side Inter Zaprešić. In late December it was announced that Mihael Mikić left the club to join the Japanese side Sanfrecce Hiroshima for €800,000. The last player to arrive in the winter transfer window was the 34-year-old Croatian international Robert Kovač, who signed from Borussia Dortmund for €500,000.

Six youth players also signed their first senior contracts, out of which only Ivan Tomečak joined the first team squad, while the rest were loaned to NK Lokomotiva, Dinamo's feeder club.

Additionally, Dario Zahora, the 26-year-old Croatian forward who spent the last couple of seasons on loan spells at Slovenian sides Domžale and Interblock Ljubljana, joined Norwegian powerhouse Rosenborg for €280,000 in March 2009.

Defender Dino Drpić, a product of Dinamo's youth academy and a permanent member of the first team squad since 2000, was abruptly suspended in January 2009, for "poor disciplinary record". He was removed from the first team and soon loaned out to German side Karlsruher SC. It was announced on 21 May 2009 that Karlsruhe bought Drpić's contract for €900,000, with the German side trailing at the bottom of the league table with just one match left to play.

In

Out

Club

Coaching staff

Kit

|
|
|

Competitions

Overall

Prva HNL

Classification

Results summary

Results by round

Results by opponent

Source: Prva HNL 2008–09 article

UEFA Cup

Classification

Matches

Competitive

Last updated 31 May 2009Sources: Sportske novosti, Sportnet.hr

Friendlies

HNL Indoor Tournament
(All games played at Krešimir Ćosić Arena in Zadar.)

Player seasonal records
Competitive matches only. Updated to games played 31 May 2009.

Key

Goalscorers

Source: Competitive matches

Notes

1. : On 5 March 2009 the managing board decided to release both Boško Balaban and Tomo Šokota citing "poor performance".
2. : On 13 January the club's management announced that Dino Drpić was to be suspended due to "poor disciplinary record". His contract was terminated and was put on transfer list, and was subsequently loaned to Karlsruher SC.
3. : Ilija Sivonjić signed for Dinamo in the winter transfer window from Inter Zaprešić; he scored 8 goals for Inter in the first 18 rounds of the Prva HNL 2008–09 season.
4. : Mihael Mikić was released and joined Sanfrecce Hiroshima in the winter transfer window in January 2009.

References

External links
 Dinamo Zagreb official website

GNK Dinamo Zagreb seasons
Dinamo Zagreb
Croatian football championship-winning seasons